Dioscorea hastifolia, the Adjigo (ˈadʒɪɡəʊ) yam, also known as the Warram, is a yam with long, white, edible tubers that is native to South Western Australia. It is a climbing vine with hastate, spearheaded, leaves and bears green triangular fruit.
The tubers are used by Australian Aboriginals as a source of carbohydrates, whom cultivated the plant extensively.
After the yellow flowers have seeded the plant is dug up in winter and roasted.

References

hastifolia